CX 36 Radio Centenario is a Uruguayan Spanish-language AM radio station that broadcasts from Montevideo.

This radio station has a strong leftist political tendency.

References

External links
 
 Radio Centenario at Facebook
 1250 AM

Spanish-language radio stations
Radio in Uruguay
Mass media in Montevideo